In 2008 Simon Thirlaway was nominated for MTV Video Music Award for Best Cinematography on Katy Perry — "I Kissed a Girl" (Director of Photography: Simon Thirlaway).

Simon Thirlaway is a Director of Photography. Simon Thirlaway's cinematographic oeuvre extends to a diverse range of commercials, music videos, live concerts, and feature-length films. Over the years, he has filmed commercials for brands such as Fanta, Coffee-Mate, Kindle books, and Doritos. Mr. Thirlaway has provided cinematography for dozens of music videos, including "Chillin" by Wale and featuring Lady Gaga, Rob Thomas' "Little Wonders", John Mayer's "Half of My Heart", and Jason Derulo's "Ridin' Solo". He has additionally undertaken cinematographic responsibilities on live concerts featuring Muse, Metallica, and John Tesh and directed by Wayne Isham. Simon Thirlaway began his career in London, engaging in lighting and electrician capacities on film productions. He notably served as electrician on the 1997 Pet Shop Boys: Somewhere video documentary. In 1999, he was best boy for the Tim Roth-directed drama The War Zone and in 2005 he was electrician for the Hollywood film Hard Candy. Mr. Thirlaway gained recognition in 2008 for his pioneering work in utilising a Red One digital camera. He had previously utilised digital cameras such as Thomson's Grass Valley Viper and Sony's F950 and F900 CineAlta models, but the Doritos cinema ad represented the first such use of The Red One camera. He filmed the 30-second teaser in a number of distinct environments, including a paparazzi-filled crowd and a live-concert venue. Simon Thirlaway has since filmed a number of projects utilising The Red One, including commercials for Der Wienerschnitzel, Ford/American Idol, Toyota, POM, and Guitar Hero 5.

References

Living people
British cinematographers
British music video directors
Year of birth missing (living people)